The Buddha Dhatu Jadi (also known as the Bandarban Golden Temple) is located close to Balaghata town, in Bandarban City, in Bangladesh. Dhatu are the material remains of a holy person, and in this temple the relics belong to Buddha. It is the largest Theravada Buddhist temple in Bangladesh and has the second-largest Buddha statue in the country.

The Bandaban Golden Temple belongs to the Theravada Buddhism order, which is practiced by the Marma indigenous people, a dominant ethnic group of Bandarban. It was built in 2000 in Arakanese architecture, an adoption of the South East Asia style.

Location
 
 
The Buddhist temple is known in local language as Kyang. It is located in the remote Bandarban Hill District in south-eastern Bangladesh, which is part of the Chittagong Division of Chittagong Hill Tracts. The temple is ensconced in the hill town of Bandarban, which has two of the highest peaks with rolling hills, namely, the Tajingdong and the Keokeradong, covered with dense forests with lush vegetation. Sangu river flows through the town. There is also a waterfall nearby. Within the Bandarban town, the notable structures are the Ethnic Cultural Institute and a Museum. There is also a lake on the hill known as the Debota Pukur (meaning:"pond of the God").

History

Bandarban has a large ethnic population of Buddhists. Buddhism is practiced by a small percentage of 0.7 in Bangladesh, predominantly a Muslim country. Buddhism is the third-largest religion in Bangladesh and the practice is of Theravada Buddhism; most Buddhists are from the south-eastern district of Chittagong and Chittagong Hill Tracts.

In Bangladesh, the Theravada Buddhism, now practiced as "Sangharaj Nikaya", was introduced in the late 19th century, replacing many of the old forms of Buddhism practiced till then. The credit for this is given to Ven. Saramedha, known popularly as "Sangharaj".

The ethnic population of the town belongs mostly to Marma, an indigenous group of the Chittagong hill region on the eastern end of the country. They are of Arakanese descent and Buddhists by religion, and are the second-largest indigenous group in the hill districts of Bangladesh.

Ven. U Pannya Jota Mahathera is the founder and chief priest of the temple. He belongs to the royal Bohmong family of Bandarban. He is a Theravada monk since 1991. He had served the government of Bangladesh for 8 years as a senior assistant judge. The Buddha's dhatu (relic), which is enshrined in the temple, was a gift given to Ven. U Pannya Jota Mahathera in 1994 by the State Sangha Maha Nayaka Committee of Myanmar.

Architecture
Approached by an elegant stairway, the impressive temple built on the hill top is decorated with exquisite sculptural images. Apart from the second-biggest statue of the Buddha that is enshrined in the sanctum, there are smaller statues and a golden bell set on a dragon within the temple precincts. Construction of the temple was started in 1995 and completed in 2000. The dhatu, the corporeal relics of Buddha, has been enshrined here below four statues of Buddha. Buddhists commonly believe that it provides for peace of mind and happiness. The temple now forms a part of the Tourism Development Project of the 'Buddhist Circuit Tour' that is sponsored by the South Asia Subregional Economic Cooperation.

A strict dress code of 'no shorts and no shoes' in temple precincts is followed here.

Gallery

References

 Beautiful Bangladesh

 
 

Buddhist temples in Bangladesh
Bandarban District
Buildings and structures in Chittagong Division
History of Chittagong Division
Buddhist relics
Overseas Burmese Buddhist temples
20th-century Buddhist temples
Religious organizations established in 1995
Religious buildings and structures completed in 2000